Mata de Plátano is a district of the Goicoechea canton, in the San José province of Costa Rica.

Geography 
Mata de Plátano has an area of  km² and an elevation of  metres.

Demographics 

For the 2011 census, Mata de Plátano had a population of  inhabitants.

Economy
One of its main economic activities is the plantation of cypress, used as Christmas trees in Costa Rica. Along with its immediate neighbors San Ramón District and San Rafael District, it forms one of the main cypress production areas in all the Costa Rican Central Region.

Transportation

Road transportation 
The district is covered by the following road routes:
 National Route 205

Government
The syndic is William García Arias.

References 

Districts of San José Province
Populated places in San José Province